For Lebesgue's lemma for open covers of compact spaces in topology see Lebesgue's number lemma

In mathematics, Lebesgue's lemma is an important statement in approximation theory.  It provides a bound for the projection error, controlling the error of approximation by a linear subspace based on a linear projection relative to the optimal error together with the operator norm of the projection.

Statement
Then for each  in :

where the last inequality uses the fact that  together with the definition of the operator norm .

See also
 Lebesgue constant (interpolation)

References
 

Lemmas in analysis
Approximation theory